Christopher or Chris Walsh may refer to:

 Christopher A. Walsh, professor of neurology
 Christopher T. Walsh, biochemist at Harvard Medical School
 Chris Walsh (American football) (born 1968), American football player
 Chris Walsh (cricketer) (born 1975), English cricketer
 Chris Walsh (politician) (1951-2018), American architect and politician
 Chris Walsh (rugby league) (born 1962), Australian rugby league footballer

See also
Christy Walsh (disambiguation)
Chris Welsh (disambiguation)